The 1992 United States presidential election in the District of Columbia took place on November 3, 1992, as part of the 1992 United States presidential election. Voters chose three representatives, or electors to the Electoral College, who voted for president and vice president.

The District of Columbia, heavily Democratic, was won in a landslide by Governor Bill Clinton (D-Arkansas) with 84.64% of the popular vote over incumbent President George H. W. Bush (R-Texas) with 9.10%. Businessman Ross Perot (I-Texas) finished in third, with 4.25% of the popular vote. Clinton ultimately won the national vote, defeating incumbent President Bush and Perot.

The District of Columbia would be one of only four electoral units where if Bush’s and Perot’s vote had been combined, Clinton would still come out on top, along with New York, Arkansas, and Maryland.

Results

See also
 United States presidential elections in the District of Columbia

References

District of Columbia
1992
United States president